Dickinson Avenue Historic District is a national historic district located at Greenville, Pitt County, North Carolina. The district encompasses 35 contributing buildings and 3 contributing structures in a mixed commercial and industrial section of Greenville.  It includes buildings dated from about 1902 to 1956 and notable examples of Classical Revival and Commercial architecture.  Notable buildings include the Brown Building (c. 1916), Hines Building (c. 1916), First Christian Church (1916), Roxy Theater (1948), and the Imperial Tobacco Company factory (1902-1964).

It was listed on the National Register of Historic Places in 2007.

References

Historic districts on the National Register of Historic Places in North Carolina
Neoclassical architecture in North Carolina
National Register of Historic Places in Greenville, North Carolina